USS Chiwawa (AO-68) is a former T3-S-A1  constructed for the United States Navy during World War II.  She was the only U.S. Navy ship named for the Chiwawa River in Washington.

Chiwawa was launched 25 June 1942 by Bethlehem Steel Co., Sparrows Point, Maryland, under a Maritime Commission contract as SS Samoset, sponsored by Mrs. H. G. Smith, acquired by the Navy 24 December 1942 and commissioned the same day, reporting to the Atlantic Fleet.

History

Military service

Chiwawa cleared Norfolk, Virginia, 13 February 1943 to load oil at Aruba, and returned to New York 25 February to join a convoy for Casablanca, Morocco, which sailed 4 March. Attacked by a wolf-pack east of the Azores, the convoy lost four ships, but aircraft from Port Lyautey, Morocco, drove the U-boats away, and the remainder of the convoy arrived safely 21 March. Chiwawa put out of Casablanca in convoy 11 April for Norfolk, arriving 28 April after a quiet passage. Between 4 May and 17 July she ferried oil on the east coast, loading at Aruba, Netherlands West Indies, and Port Arthur, Texas, and discharging her cargo at Bermuda, Argentia, Newfoundland and Norfolk. She made three convoy crossings, to Scotland, Wales, and Casablanca, between 17 July and 4 December, then resumed operations to Port Arthur and Aruba, except for the period 25 January-8 March 1944, when she again crossed to North Africa.

After two convoy crossings to the British Isles in May and July 1944, Chiwawa sailed 14 July from Norfolk for Mers el Kebir, Algeria, and Naples, Italy, arriving 5 August. From Naples, Chiwawa fueled the ships carrying out the invasion of southern France until she retired to Oran, Algeria, on 2 September. She returned to New York 14 September to resume coastal oil runs until her next convoy to Casablanca in November.

A series of runs between Aruba and New York, then to Guantánamo Bay and Bermuda, and later to Argentia occupied Chiwawa until 31 May 1945, when she entered Norfolk Navy Yard for overhaul until 1 July. She cleared Norfolk to load oil at Baytown, Texas, and on 1 August reached Pearl Harbor. Five days later she sailed for Ulithi and Okinawa, where from 30 August to 29 November she served as station tanker, making one voyage in September to fuel the U.S. 7th Fleet at sea. Homeward bound, Chiwawa put in at San Francisco, California, and Balboa, arriving at New York 7 January 1946.

She sailed 19 January 1946 from Melville, Rhode Island, for ports in England, Germany, and France, called at Casco Bay and Argentia, and put back to Iceland before her arrival in New York 18 March. Chiwawa was decommissioned 6 May 1946 and transferred to the Maritime Commission 23 August 1946.

Civilian service

She was then rebuilt as a straight-decked bulk freighter for Great Lakes service, at American Shipbuilding, Lorain, Ohio, renamed SS Walter A. Sterling sailing for the Cleveland Cliffs Steamship Company and launched, 15 July 1961. That conversion included the integration of a 510-foot midbody cargo section constructed in Germany and towed across the Atlantic Ocean. She was sold in 1985 to Ford Motor Company, renamed SS William Clay Ford (II).  In 1989, she was sold again, this time to Lakes Shipping Co. and renamed SS Lee A. Tregurtha. Now owned by Interlake Steamship Company, Lee A. Tregurtha had her steam turbine replaced with two 3000 kW (4050 HP) Rolls-Royce Bergen B32:40-L6A diesel engines during the 2005-2006 lay-up. Throughout the summer of 2020 she was docked at Fraser Shipyards in Superior, Wisconsin, due to the downturn of shipping demand caused by the COVID-19 pandemic. She rejoined the lakes fleet in March 2021 and is currently active.

As a civilian vessel, MV Lee A. Tregurtha has a crew of 21, comprising 7 officers and 14 crew, compared to the Chiwawa wartime complement of about 225 officers and enlisted men.

Awards and honors 

Chiwawa received two battle stars for World War II service.

She was authorized:

References

External links 
 

 Official M/V Lee A. Tregurtha Webpage

 

Chiwawa-class oilers
Ships built in Sparrows Point, Maryland
1942 ships
World War II auxiliary ships of the United States
World War II tankers of the United States
Great Lakes freighters
Ships built in Lorain, Ohio